O&A or O and A may refer to:

 Orange and Alexandria Railroad, a defunct railroad operating within the U.S. state of Virginia
 Opie and Anthony, a former radio talk show in the United States